National Highway 231 (NH 231) is a  National Highway in India.It connects Maheshkhunt, Saharsa, Madhepura, Purnia and Kora.

Route
National highway 231 transits across one state of India in east - west direction. It is spur road of

Bihar
Maheshkhunt
Sonbarsa
 Simri Bakhtiyarpur
 Bangaon
Saharsa 
Madhepura
Murliganj
Banmankhi 
Purnea
Kora

Junction

  Terminal at Maheshkhunt.
  near Bangaon
  near Madhepura
  near Line Bazar, Purnea
  near Gulabbagh, Purnea
   Terminal at Kora.

References

National highways in India